Hartranft is a surname. Notable people with the surname include:

Chester David Hartranft (1839–1914), American educator
Glenn Hartranft (1901–1970), American Olympic athlete and college sports coach
John F. Hartranft (1830–1899), American politician and military general
M.V. Hartranft (1872?–1945), American agriculturalist, land developer, and railway executive
Priscilla Ahn (born 1984), born Priscilla Natalie Hartranft
Ray Hartranft (1890–1955), American baseball player